The M4, originally the London-South Wales Motorway, is a motorway in the United Kingdom running from west London to southwest Wales. The English section to the Severn Bridge was constructed between 1961 and 1971; the Welsh element was largely complete by 1980, though a non-motorway section around Briton Ferry bridge remained until 1993. On the opening of the Second Severn Crossing in 1996, the M4 was rerouted over it.

The line of the motorway from London to Bristol runs closely in parallel with the A4. After crossing the River Severn, toll-free since 17 December 2018, the motorway follows the A48, to terminate at the Pont Abraham services in Carmarthenshire.

The M4 is the only motorway in Wales apart from its two spurs: the A48(M) and the M48. The major towns and cities along the routea distance of approximately include Slough, Reading, Swindon, Bristol, Newport,  Cardiff, Bridgend, Port Talbot and Swansea.

History
A new road from London to South Wales was first proposed in the 1930s. In 1956 the Ministry of Transport announced the plans for the first major post-war road improvement projects.

The Chiswick flyover, a short section of elevated dual-carriageway, not originally classed as a motorway, opened in 1959 to reduce the impact of traffic travelling between central London and the west.

The Maidenhead bypass (J7-J9) opened in 1961, the section from Slough to Maidenhead (J5-J7) opened in 1963 and J1-J5 opened on 24 March 1965 incorporating the Chiswick Flyover. The stretch from J18 to the west of Newport was opened in 1966, including the Severn Bridge. The Port Talbot by-pass, also built in the 1960s and now part of the M4, was originally the A48(M) motorway, a number now allocated to a short section of motorway near Cardiff. The Ministry of Transport originally intended that the M4 would terminate at Tredegar Park west of Newport, and following the creation of the Welsh Office that the Government became committed to a high-standard dual carriageway to Carmarthenshire.

The English section of the motorway was completed on 22 December 1971 when the  stretch between junctions 9 and 15 Maidenhead and Swindon) was opened to traffic. The Welsh section was largely completed between 1970 and 1980, though a non-motorway section remained across the Briton Ferry bridge until 1993, when a second motorway-only bridge opened. 

In 1996, the Second Severn Crossing opened with new link motorways on either side of the estuary to divert the M4 over the new crossing. At the same time, the original route over the Severn Bridge was redesignated the M48, and the M49 was opened to link the new crossing with the M5 at Avonmouth.
The new M49 shortened the route between South Wales and the South West, and reduced traffic at the busy M4/M5 junction at Almondsbury.

After completion
In April 2005, speed checks carried out by police camera vans between junction 14 and junction 18 led to a public protest, involving a "go-slow" of several hundred vehicles along the affected sections of the motorway.

Between 2007 and January 2010, the section from Castleton (junction 29) to Coryton (junction 32) was widened to six lanes. The scheme was formally opened on 25 January 2010 by Ieuan Wyn Jones the Deputy First Minister for Wales.

During 2009, the Newport section of the motorway between junctions 23a and 29 was upgraded with a new concrete central barrier. In February 2010, it was proposed that the M4 in South Wales would become the first hydrogen highway with hydrogen stations provided along the route, with an aspiration for further stations to be provided along the M4 into South West England over time.

Between 2008 and 2010, junction 11 was extensively remodelled with a new four-lane junction, two new road bridges and other works. The £65million scheme included work on the Mereoak roundabout and part of the A33 Swallowfield Bypass near Shinfield, and also the conversion of the two existing bridges, one of which is available only to pedestrians and cyclists and the other to buses. It also involved the movement of the local Highways Agency and Fire Service offices, and the construction of a long footbridge network, a new bus lane and a new gyratory. Sound barriers for nearby residential areas were also installed. In April 2008, the decision to preserve a rare Vickers machine gun pillbox and turn it into a bat roost was announced by the developers.

Former bridge tolls
Tolls were charged on the Severn Bridge(s) from opening until 2018. In 1966 the toll was 12.5pence each-way for cars, rising to £1 in the late 1980s. Around 1991 the toll was doubled but charged in the westbound direction only, to reduce queuing. After 1996, the tolls were equal westbound-only on both bridges, and rose steeply after 2000 to a peak of £6.70 for cars in 2017, leading to protests from Welsh businesses.   
Tolls on both bridges over the River Severn were eliminated on 17 December 2018, and the former toll booths were removed in 2019.

Timeline of construction

Maintenance 
The  in Wales is the responsibility of the South Wales Trunk Road Agent.

Features

Speed limits
For the majority of its length, the national speed limit applies. Exceptions include the following:
  on the Chiswick Flyover within London in both directions.
  between junction 4 and the Chiswick Flyover, eastbound only.
  on the Port Talbot elevated section between junction 40 and junction 41. The fixed speed camera was removed in 2006 as it was believed to be causing tailbacks. In July 2014, an average speed camera system was installed; it generated around £500,000 in fines in the first six months.
  between junctions 24 and 28 at Newport.

Smart motorway 

The M4 has one section of smart motorway, between junctions 19 (M32) and 20 (M5) north of Bristol, where there are variable speed limits and a part-time hard-shoulder. Completion was in summer 2014. Another section between junctions 24 and 29 in Newport had variable speed limits until 2021, when it was changed to a permanent 50 mph limit with average speed cameras.

In 2010, it was announced that the motorway would be changed to a smart motorway between junctions 3 and 12. Work started in autumn 2018 and is expected to be completed in March 2022 at a cost of £848 million.

Brynglas tunnels

The Brynglas Tunnels carry the M4 under Brynglas Hill in Newport. The  tunnels are the first and only twin–bored tunnels in the UK motorway network (the Dartford Tunnel is not classified as part of the M25 motorway).
In July 2011, a lorry fire in one tunnel closed the motorway. Although there were no injuries and no deaths, the tunnel remained closed and a contraflow system was in place in the remaining tunnel for about one month, causing major travel delays.

Bus lane

In June 1999, the M4 bus lane was created on the third lane between junctions 2 and 3, initially as a pilot scheme and then a permanent arrangement from 2001. A lower speed limit was introduced along this section at the same time. The  bus lane was on the eastbound carriageway; from the western end of the Chiswick Flyover near Brentford to junction 3 (A312), covering part of the  journey between Heathrow Airport and central London. The lane which had no intermediate exits was for use by buses, coaches, motorcycles, emergency vehicles and licensed taxis but not mini-cabs.

In December 2010, the bus lane was suspended for 18 months. It was reinstated temporarily for the 2012 Summer Olympics and then permanently decommissioned.

Porous road surface
Near junction 35 of the M4, there is a stretch of the motorway that has a surfacing of porous asphalt that improves drainage and reduces noise.  When driving in heavy rain drivers notice a reduction in road spray from other vehicles and improved visibility. This special surface was publicised in an episode of the BBC's Tomorrow's World programme. This was the site of the first trial of the new road surface when it was laid down in 1993.

Elevated and heated section
The elevated section of the M4 in West London, built in the 1960s, is mostly directly above the A4 and extends over parts of Brentford's Golden Mile. This section was designed to have a heated road surface to reduce icing in winter.

Four level stack interchanges

The M4 has two of the three four-level stack interchanges in the UK, including the first UK example at junction 20, the "Almondsbury Interchange" with the M5. The other is junction 4b with the M25. Junction 4b has to make provision for the railway line passing beneath the M4. Due to the nature of these junctions, one cannot make a U-turn at either of them.

Notable junctions
Junction 8/9 near Maidenhead, Berkshire, and High Wycombe, Buckinghamshire is the only one in the UK with dual numbers. This arose at the time when the M4 turned north near junction 8, where it met the A308, and headed for the original junction 9, where the motorway ended at a roundabout interchange with the A4. When the westward extension was opened, junction 8 was closed and a new junction built a little to the west, taking both numbers. The road to the A4 became A423(M) and later A404(M), and the junction with the A4 became 9B. Junction 9A is the exit for Cox Green and White Waltham. To the west of junction 13 on the eastbound carriageway there are a set of sliproads signposted "Works Unit Only". The signs have red borders, implying a military exit. It is a back entrance to RAF Welford, a Second World War airfield and now an RAF/USAF military installation mainly used for storing munitions. The M4 entrance allows easier access for the large vehicles used to carry the munitions.

Plans for the "missing" Junction 31, also known as the Thornhill interchange, for which planning permission was originally granted in September 1991 (but subsequently expired), were rekindled after proposals for a new business park on a  site north of the M4 were submitted in 2007 to Cardiff Council. The developers of the business park, St Modwen Developments, would likely fund the new junction, which would be on the A469. A freedom of information request in 2010 to Cardiff Council shows that whilst the land that would enable this junction should continue to be strategically protected, the decision to formally abandon the proposed Junction 31 Thornhill was made in October 2007 and there had been no subsequent mention of it in Cardiff Council Strategic or Planning meetings since.
In South Wales, the M4 has to thread its way through mountainous terrain and built-up areas, so there are some unusual junction layouts. Junction 27 (High Cross) is a normal grade-separated roundabout junction, but has severe space constraints: traffic joining the motorway must initially travel in the opposite direction to the intended direction of travel, before making a sharp left-hand turn from the slip road onto the motorway. At the time of construction, junction numbers 30 and 31 were reserved for future intermediate interchanges. Junction 30 (Cardiff Gate) has since been added, but there are no current plans to construct Junction 31 (A469 road). Junction 39 can only be used to access the motorway from a single slip road onto the westbound carriageway from the A48 at junction 38. There is no exit from the motorway at this junction.

Junction 41 comprises two different junctions; one for local traffic to and from the west and one from the east. The former leads to and from a spur leading to the roundabout in Briton Ferry, formerly known as junction 41a, and the original bridge over the River Neath, which would allow access onto the stretch of the M4 from junction 43 westward. The second, eastern junction leads to and from the A48 towards Port Talbot. As a result, one can travel for almost  on the motorway in either direction, both joining and then leaving the motorway at junction 41. Junction 44 is unusual in that the eastbound entrance dives under the inside of the junction, effectively creating a "right-turn" on a roundabout. Similarly, slip roads pass under or over the main motorway at junctions 41 and 42.

There have been calls to close the slip roads at junctions 40 and 41 to improve traffic flow. The motorway has only two lanes on this stretch and is a major traffic congestion blackspot. The short slip roads have not been modernised. A small-scale trial of closing the westbound on-slip of junction 41 between 7 am and 9 am and from 4 pm to 6 pm on weekdays started on 4 August 2014 but following heavy criticism from local businesses and residents, was stopped on 29 May 2015.

Relief road

On 5 June 2019, the Welsh Government scrapped the proposal for a proposed motorway south of Newport. The Welsh Assembly Government had revived the scheme as a tolled bypass in 2007 and later abandoned it for financial reasons. An extension to the Newport Southern Distributor Road through the old Corus steel works was considered. This road is already a dual carriageway. A public consultation exercise on options for improving the capacity of the M4 corridor around Newport opened on 5 March 2012.  Its website states that: "the motorway around Newport does not conform to today’s motorway standards. It lacks continuous hard shoulders, has closely spaced junctions with sub-standard slip road visibility and narrows to a restricted two lane section through the Brynglas Tunnels. Heavy congestion occurs along this stretch and either side of it at peak hours."

List of junctions 

{| style="margin-left:1em; margin-bottom:1em; color:black; font-size:90%;" class="wikitable"
|-  style="background:#0080d0; text-align:center; color:white; font-size:120%;"
| colspan="5" | M4 motorway
|-
!scope=col|mile
!scope=col|km
!scope=col abbr="Eastbound"|Eastbound exits (B carriageway)
!scope=col|Junction
!scope=col abbr="Westbound"|Westbound exits (A carriageway)
|- style="text-align:center;"
|7.3
|11.8
|Road continues as A4 to Central London
|J1
| Start of motorway
|- style="text-align:center;"
|8.38.5
|13.4  13.7
| North Circular A406South Circular A205Chiswick A315
|J2
| Staines, Hounslow, Brentford A4
|- style="text-align:center;"
|12.512.8
|20.120.6
|Heston services
|Services
|Heston services
|- style="text-align:center;"
|13.413.7
|21.5  22.1
| Heathrow  (Terminals 4, 5 & Cargo), Hayes, Harrow, Hounslow A312
|J3
| Heathrow  (Terminals 4, 5 & Cargo), Hayes, Harrow, Hounslow A312
|- style="text-align:center;"
|15.215.7
|24.5  25.2
| Heathrow  (Terminals 2 & 3) (A4) Uxbridge A408
|J4a
| Heathrow  (Terminals 2 & 3) (A4) Uxbridge A408
|- style="text-align:center;"
|16.817.7
|27.0  28.5
| Heathrow (Terminals 4, 5 & Cargo) , Gatwick Airport , Watford (M3), (M23), (M40), (M1) M25
|J4bHarmondsworth Interchange
| Heathrow (Terminals 4, 5&Cargo), Gatwick, Watford (M3), (M23), (M40), (M1), M25
|- style="text-align:center;"
|
|
| style=background:skyblue | Entering Greater London
|
| style=background:skyblue | Entering Berkshire
|- style="text-align:center;"
|19.119.5
| 30.7 31.4
| Colnbrook, Langley, Slough (East) A4Eton, Datchet B470
| J5
| Colnbrook, Langley, Slough (East)  A4, Datchet B470
|- style="text-align:center;"
|22.923.2
| 36.8  37.4
| Slough (Central) A355Windsor A322
|J6
| Slough (Central) A355Windsor A322
|- style="text-align:center;"
|
|
| style=background:skyblue | Entering Berkshire
|
| style=background:skyblue | Entering Buckinghamshire
|- style="text-align:center;"
|24.725.0
| 39.8  40.3
| Slough (West) A4
|J7
| Slough (West) A4
|- style="text-align:center;"
|
|
| style=background:skyblue | Entering Buckinghamshire
|
| style=background:skyblue | Entering Berkshire
|- style="text-align:center;"
|27.828.2
| 44.7  45.4
| High Wycombe, Henley A404(M)Maidenhead A308(M)
|J8/9
| High Wycombe, Henley A404(M)Maidenhead A308(M)
|- style="text-align:center;"
|35.035.8
| 56.4  57.6
| Reading (East), Wokingham, Bracknell A329(M)
|J10
| Reading (East), Wokingham, Bracknell A329(M)
|- style="text-align:center;"
|40.641.2
|65.4 66.3
| Basingstoke, Reading (Central & South) A33
|J11
| Basingstoke, Reading (Central & South) A33
|- style="text-align:center;"
|43.543.8
|70.0 70.5
|Reading services
|Services
|Reading services
|- style="text-align:center;"
|45.345.7
| 72.9 73.5
| Reading (West), Theale A4
|J12
| Reading (West), Theale A4
|- style="text-align:center;"
|56.957.2
|91.5  92.1
| Newbury, Oxford A34Chieveley services (Moto)
|J13Services
| Newbury, Oxford A34Chieveley services (Moto) 
|- style="text-align:center;"
|64.464.8
|103.7  104.3
| Hungerford, Wantage A338
|J14
| Hungerford, Wantage A338
|- style="text-align:center;"
|68.7
|110.5
|Membury services
|Services
|Membury services
|- style="text-align:center;"
|
|
| style=background:skyblue | Entering Berkshire
|
| style=background:skyblue | Entering Wiltshire
|- style="text-align:center;"
|76.477.1
|122.9  124.0
| Swindon (East) A419Marlborough A346Oxford (A420)
|J15
| Swindon A419, Marlborough A346
|- style="text-align:center;"
|82.482.8
|132.6  133.2
| Swindon (West), Royal Wootton Bassett, Wroughton, MoD Lyneham, Calne A3102
|J16
| Swindon (West), Royal Wootton Bassett, Wroughton, MoD Lyneham, Calne A3102
|- style="text-align:center;"
|94.895.3
|152.5  153.4
| Chippenham A350Cirencester A429
|J17
| Chippenham A350Cirencester A429
|- style="text-align:center;"
|96.7
|155.7
|Leigh Delamere services
|Services
|Leigh Delamere services
|- style="text-align:center;"
|
|
| style=background:skyblue | Entering Wiltshire
|
| style=background:skyblue | Entering Gloucestershire
|- style="text-align:center;"
|104.9105.6
|168.8  170.0
| Bath, Stroud A46
|J18
| Bath, Stroud A46
|- style="text-align:center;"
|112.8113.2
|181.5  182.1
| Bristol M32
|J19
| Bristol M32
|- style="text-align:center;"
|115.8116.3
|186.3  187.2
| The South West, Bristol (West), The Midlands, Gloucester, Bristol Airport , M5    
|J20Almondsbury Interchange
| The South West, Bristol (West) M5(S) The Midlands, Gloucester M5(N)
|- style="text-align:center;"
|117.7189.5
|189.5  190.0
|No access
|J21
| Chepstow M48
|- style="text-align:center;"
|121.3121.6
|195.2  195.7
| Avonmouth M49
|J22
| Avonmouth M49
|- style="text-align:center;"
| rowspan=2 | 121.7124.1
| rowspan=2 | 195.9199.8
| style=background:skyblue | Entering Gloucestershire
| rowspan=2 | Second Severn Crossing
| Entry into Wales
|- style="text-align:center;"
| Entry into England
| style=background:skyblue | Entering Gwent
|- style="text-align:center;"
|127.0
|204.4
| No toll plaza
| Bridge Toll
| style="background:#dcdcfe;"| Former toll plaza (closed Dec 2018)
|- style="text-align:center;"
|129.2
|208.0
| Chepstow M48
|J23
|No access
|- style="text-align:center;"
|131.4132.2
|211.4212.8
| Magor, Caldicot A4810Magor services
|J23A  Services
| Magor, Caldicot A4810 Magor services
|- style="text-align:center;"
|134.8135.6
|217.0218.3
| City centre A48Newport (East) B4237Monmouth A449The Midlands (M50)
|J24
| City centre A48Newport (East) B4237Monmouth A449
|- style="text-align:center;"
|137.9
|222.0
|No access
|J25
| Caerleon B4596
|- style="text-align:center;"
|138.3
|222.6
|No access
|J25A
| Newport, Cwmbran A4042
|- style="text-align:center;"
|138.8139.1
|223.4223.8
|Brynglas Tunnels
|Tunnel
|Brynglas Tunnels
|- style="text-align:center;"
|139.1139.5
|223.8224.5
| Newport, Cwmbran, Caerleon A4051
|J26
| Newport A4051
|- style="text-align:center;"
|140.8141,4
|226.6227.6
| High Cross B4591
|J27
| High Cross B4591
|- style="text-align:center;"
|142.0142.9
|228.5230.0
| Newport A48Risca, Brynmawr A467
|J28
| Newport A48Risca, Brynmawr A467
|- style="text-align:center;"
|143.6
|231.1
|No access
|J29
| Cardiff (East and South) A48(M)
|- style="text-align:center;"
|
|
| style=background:skyblue | Entering Gwent
|
| style=background:skyblue | Entering South Glamorgan
|- style="text-align:center;"
|146.6147.3
|236.0237.0
| Cardiff (East) A4232Cardiff Gate services
|J30  Services
| Cardiff (East) A4232Cardiff Gate services
|- style="text-align:center;"
|151.9244.5
|244.5246.1
| Merthyr Tydfil, Cardiff A470
|J32
| Cardiff (North), Merthyr Tydfil A470
|- style="text-align:center;"
|155.4156.0
|250.1251.1
| Cardiff (West), Barry, Penarth A4232Cardiff Airport Cardiff West services
|J33Services
| Cardiff (West), Barry, Penarth A4232Cardiff Airport Cardiff West services
|- style="text-align:center;"
|157.5158.1
|253.5254.4
| Llantrisant, Rhondda A4119Royal Glamorgan Hospital
|J34
| Llantrisant, Rhondda A4119Royal Glamorgan Hospital
|- style="text-align:center;"
|
|
| style=background:skyblue | Entering South Glamorgan
|
| style=background:skyblue | Entering Mid Glamorgan
|- style="text-align:center;"
|163.9164.4
|263.7264.5
| Pen-coed A473
|J35
| Bridgend, Pen-coed A473
|- style="text-align:center;"
|167.5168.3
|269.6270.8
| Bridgend A4061Maesteg A4063Princess of Wales HospitalSarn Park services
|J36Services
| Bridgend A4061Maesteg A4063Princess of Wales HospitalSarn Park services
|- style="text-align:center;"
|172.8173.5
|278.1279.3
| Pyle, Porthcawl A4229
|J37
| Porthcawl, Pyle A4229
|- style="text-align:center;"
|
|
| style=background:skyblue | Entering Mid Glamorgan
|
| style=background:skyblue | Entering West Glamorgan
|- style="text-align:center;"
|177.0177.3
|284.9285.3
| Port Talbot A48
|J38
| Port Talbot A48
|- style="text-align:center;"
|178.3
|286.9
|No access (on-ramp only)
|J39
|No access
|- style="text-align:center;"
|179.7179.9
|289.2289.6
| Port Talbot A4107
|J40
| Port Talbot A4107
|- style="text-align:center;"
|180.9181.3
|291.1291.8
| Port Talbot A48
|J41
| Briton Ferry A48
|- style="text-align:center;"
|183.9184.9
|295.9297.3
| Briton Ferry A48Swansea (South) A483
|J42
| Swansea (South) A483
|- style="text-align:center;"
|184.9185.7
|297.5298.8
| Neath, Merthyr Tydfil A465
|J43
| Neath, Merthyr Tydfil A465
|- style="text-align:center;"
|187.0187.4
|300.9301.6
| Swansea (East) A48
|J44
| Swansea (East) A48
|- style="text-align:center;"
|188.8189.3
| 303.9304.7
| Pontardawe, Swansea (North) A4067
|J45
| Pontardawe, Swansea (North) A4067
|- style="text-align:center;"
|190.8191.4
| 307.0308.0
| Llangyfelach B4489FelindreMorriston Hospital
|J46
| Llangyfelach B4489FelindreMorriston Hospital
|- style="text-align:center;"
|192.4193.1
|309.6310.7
| Swansea (West) A483Gorseinon A48Swansea services
|J47Services
| Swansea (West) A483Gorseinon A48Swansea services
|- style="text-align:center;"
|
|
| style=background:skyblue | Entering West Glamorgan
|
| style=background:skyblue | Entering Dyfed
|- style="text-align:center;"
|196.4197.1
|316.0317.2
| Pontarddulais, Llanelli A4138
|J48
| Pontarddulais, Llanelli A4138
|- style="text-align:center;"
|199.2
| 320.6
| Start of motorway
|J49TerminusServices
| Motorway terminates at a roundabout:Carmarthen A48Ammanford, Llandeilo A483Pontarddulais A48Pont Abraham services
|-

Coordinate list

Data from driver location signs and location marker posts are used to provide distance and carriageway identification information.  Where a junction spans several hundred metres and the data is available, both the start and finish values for the junction are shown.

E30
Although not signed, European route E30 includes most of the M4. The entire route runs  between Cork in Ireland and Omsk in Russia.

Major incidents and accidents
 In June 1984 a crash near Maidenhead resulted in 13 deaths.
 In March 1991, ten people died in the 1991 M4 motorway crash near Hungerford. The crash involved 51 vehicles in foggy conditions.
 In May 1995 a coach carrying Royal British Legion members left the M4 close to the Severn Bridge, resulting in 10 deaths.
 In April 1998, drummer Cozy Powell died following a car accident on the M4 near Bristol.
 In July 2002, Gus Dudgeon, a music producer known for his work with Elton John, and his wife died when the car he was driving veered off the M4 between Reading and Maidenhead. The inquest recorded a verdict of accidental death.

See also

 M4 corridor
 M4 Thames Bridge, Maidenhead
 List of motorways in the United Kingdom
 Transport in Wales

References

Further reading

External links

 CBRD Motorway Database – M4
 British Road Database: Motorways – M4 Junction 8/9
 The Motorway Archive
 Junctions 1 to 5
 Junctions 5 to 7
 Junctions 8 to 14
 Junctions 14 to 21
 Junctions 21 to 23
 Junctions 23 to 49
  Map of the preferred route around Newport (relief road)

 
Constituent roads of European route E30
Motorways in England
Motorways in London
Motorways in Wales
Roads in Berkshire
Roads in Bristol
Transport in Bridgend County Borough
Transport in Cardiff
Transport in Carmarthenshire
Transport in the London Borough of Hillingdon
Transport in the London Borough of Hounslow
Transport in Monmouthshire
Transport in Neath Port Talbot
Transport in Newport, Wales
Transport in Rhondda Cynon Taf
Transport in South Gloucestershire District
Transport in Swansea
Transport in Wiltshire